Rio Peguá is a watercourse in Brazil in the city of Brasilia.

References 

Rivers of Federal District (Brazil)